Below is a list of islands that have been invented for films, literature, television, or other media.

A
 The Abarat: 25 islands in an archipelago, one for each hour and one for all the hours, from the series The Books of Abarat by Clive Barker
 Absolom: a prison island in the movie Escape from Absolom
 Acidophilus: an island in Greece appearing in the adventure game Spy Fox in "Dry Cereal"
 Aepyornis Island: an atoll near Madagascar, in H. G. Wells' story by that name.
 Al Amarja: Mediterranean island state in the Over the Edge roleplaying game
 Alabasta: An island controlled by Crocodile in the OnePiece manga series
 Alca/Penguin Island: an island off the northern shore of Europe, where penguins were transformed into humans (in fact, a satirical analogue of France) in the 1908 novel L'île des Pingouins by Anatole France.
 Algonquin: an island and borough based on Manhattan, New York City in Grand Theft Auto IV.
 Alola: from  Pokémon Sun and Moon an island where the games take place
 Altis: a fictional Mediterranean island in the 2013 video game, ARMA 3.
 Altruria: from the novel A Traveler from Altruria by William Dean Howells
 Amity Island: from the book and film Jaws
 Angel Island: a major location in the Sonic the Hedgehog series of video games.
 Angel Island: an island in the Pacific Ocean in Inez Haynes Gillmore's novel of the same name
 Ape Atoll: from RuneScape
 Ape Island: from The Simpsons
 Apollo: from the video game Fortnite: Battle Royale, the main setting for the second chapter of the game
 Armorel: part of the Channel Islands, the setting for the film Appointment with Venus
 Astigos Island: an independence-seeking territory of the fictional country of the Mediterranean coastal nation of Lukano from the game Time Crisis 3
 Athena: from the video game Fortnite: Battle Royale, the main setting for the first chapter of the game
 Atlantis from Plato's dialogues
 Atoll K: from Laurel and Hardy's last movie
 Ahtohallan: a mystical glacial island in the Arctic from Frozen II
 Atuan: island in Ursula K. Le Guin's Earthsea books
 August Bank Holiday Island: a fictional Commonwealth nation featured in The Goodies, found 'between Easter Island and Christmas Island'. In the Commonwealth Games, August Bank Holiday Island won and took over the Commonwealth Nations.
 Avalon: from Arthurian legend, also the home of Oberon in Disney's Gargoyles animated series
 Avra: the smallest of the three Lone Islands in The Chronicles of Narnia series, home of Duke Bern
 Azkaban: island prison in the Harry Potter series

B
 Back Cup: a fictional island in the Bermuda, hideout of the pirate Ker Karraje in Jules Verne's novel Facing the Flag.

 Bali Ha'i: the mysterious island in South Pacific and Tales of the South Pacific
 Balamb Island: from Final Fantasy VIII
 Banoi, the tropical setting of Dead Island located near Papua New Guinea.
 Battle Frontier: from Pokémon Emerald
 Beer Island: a mythical land where Linux power management works reliably.
 Beep Island: A fictional island from pre-school children's television series The Beeps.
 Berk: from the book series How to Train your Dragon and DreamWorks Franchise of the same name.
 Big Surf Island: An island in Burnout Paradise that has bigger jumps.
 Birdwell Island: A fictional island from Clifford the Big Red Dog, inspired by Martha's Vineyard. It is named after the author of the books, Norman Bridwell, but is spelled different.
 Benne Seed Island: an island off the coast of South Carolina near Charleston, where Polly O'Keefe and her family live in several novels by Madeleine L'Engle
 Bensalem: from New Atlantis by Francis Bacon
 Besaid: from Final Fantasy X and Final Fantasy X-2
 Bikanel: from Final Fantasy X and Final Fantasy X-2
 Binghuo Island (literally: Ice and Fire Island): from the wuxia novel The Heavenly Sword and the Dragon Saber by Jin Yong
 The Black Island from The Adventures of Tintin by Hergé
 Blackhawk Island: secret base of the Blackhawks during World War II and beyond.
 Island of the Blue Dolphins: (based on San Nicolas Island) from the book by Scott O'Dell.
 Blefuscu: from the novel Gulliver's Travels by Jonathan Swift
Boonsey: a Channel Island in the film The Navy Lark.
 Booty Island: a pirate island in the Caribbean in the game Monkey Island 2: LeChuck's Revenge, part of the Tri-Island area (governed by Elaine Marley)
 Borgabunda: a Southern Pacific island featured in McHale's Navy and home to a Japanese sub base.
 Britannula: setting of the novel The Fixed Period by Anthony Trollope
 Buyan: from the Russian folk lore tale of Tsar Saltan by Alexander Pushkin.

C
 C Island: from the Nintendo game StarTropics
 Cactuar Island: from Final Fantasy VII and Final Fantasy VIII
 Camp Wawanakwa: from Total Drama, particularly Total Drama Island, Total Drama Revenge of the Island, and Total Drama All-Stars
 Candy Apple Island: The Simpsons
 Candied Island: The Marvelous Misadventures of Flapjack
 Caprona, a.k.a. Caspak: from The Land That Time Forgot and its sequels
 Carlotta: small island off the coast of Peru in the movie The Bribe, reused to comic effect in Dead Men Don't Wear Plaid
 Casanga: island on the west coast of Africa in the 1936 film Song of Freedom
 Caspiar: fictional island nation home of Andy Kaufman's character Latka. It sank.
 Cascara: main setting of the film Water
 Castaway Island: where the castaways live in Pirate Islands
 Cayo Perico: private island in the Caribbean Sea owned by the Colombian narco-trafficker Juan "El Rubio" Strickler in Grand Theft Auto Online. It is mostly based on Norman's Cay, but also bears some resemblance to Hacienda Nápoles.
 Chausible Island: from the novel The New Paul and Virginia
 Chicken Island: an island that appeared in the FETCH! with Ruff Ruffman spin-off Ruff Ruffman: Humble Media Genius
 Cinnabar Island: site of the seventh Gym in the Game Boy game Pokémon Red and Blue.
 Clanbronwyn: a small island off the coast of Anglesey in the adventure game Trilby's Notes
 Club Penguin: the island featured in the game Club Penguin
 Cobra Island: small Island in the Gulf of Mexico. Sovereign nation of Cobra from G.I Joe comics.
 Coral Island: from the boy's book by R. M. Ballantyne
 Coral Island: from the animated series The Smoggies
 Corto Maltese: from Batman: The Dark Knight Returns comics
 Corona: small island of the Kingdom of Corona. Tangled
 Costa Estralita: from the film Princess Protection Program
 Crab Island: poor Caribbean island shaped like a crab, under the domination of Crocodile Island, in the Patrouille des Castors comics
 Crab Island: an island in the Caribbean Sea, from the children's novel Peter Duck by Arthur Ransome
 Crab Key: Dr. No's hideout in the first James Bond movie.
 Craggy Island (off the coast of Ireland): setting of sitcom Father Ted
 Crescent Island: a crescent-shaped island in the video game Final Fantasy IV
 Crocodile Island: Caribbean island shaped like a crocodile, with a dictatorial government which seems to be heavily influenced by Tahiti, in the La Patrouille des Castors comics
 Crocodile Isle: home of the Kremlings in the Donkey Kong series.
 Crusoeland: another name for Atoll K
 Centaur Island Xanth novels by Piers Anthony

D
 Danger Island: the setting of an adventure series on The Banana Splits Adventure Hour<ref>{{cite web|url=https://www.imdb.com/title/tt1593588/?ref_=fn_al_tt_6|title="The Banana Splits Adventure Hour" * Danger Island (TV Episode 1968)|author=darkstrangers|date=27 November 2010|work=IMDb}}</ref>
 Dazhi Island: from the novel The Return of the Condor Heroes by Jinyong
 Death Queen Island: from Saint Seiya.
 Deist: from Final Fantasy II
 Demonreach: from The Dresden Files. Demonreach is the name Harry Dresden gave to an island in Lake Michigan.
 Destiny Islands: from the video game Kingdom Hearts
 Devon Island: from James A. Michener's novel Chesapeake
 Dinosaur Island: the island where the Dinosaurs live from DC Comics.
 Dinotopia: from the eponymous book.
 Dolphin Island: (off Australia) in the novel by Arthur C. ClarkeDonkey Kong Island: from the video game series Donkey Kong
 Doorn: the largest of the three Lone Islands in The Chronicles of Narnia series, and the location of the archipelago's capital, Narrowhaven
 Dr. Franklin's Island: from the book of the same name
 Dragon Roost Island: from the GameCube game The Legend of Zelda: The Wind Waker
 Dragon, Tiger and Turtle Islands: in the children's novel Missee Lee by Arthur Ransome
 Dressrosa: an island in the New World in the One Piece manga series.

E
 Edwards Island: setting of the game Oxenfree
 Egret Island: from the novel The Mermaid Chair
 The El Nido Archipelago: setting of the game Chrono Cross
 Ember Island: from Avatar: The Last Airbender
 Erangel: a fictional abandoned island that is located in the Black Sea near Russia in 2017 Battle royale game PlayerUnknown's Battlegrounds
 Eroda: a fictional island from Harry Styles' music video for "Adore You"
 Esme: from the novel Breaking Dawn
 Estard: the only landmass left in the present world of Dragon Quest VII
 Estillyen: from the books by William E. Jefferson
 Eureka: from the movie Eureka
 Executive Bathroom Island: from the Family Guy episode Tales of a Third Grade Nothing
 Eye Land: a small lake island in Fortnite: Battle Royale
 Eventide Island: from the videogame "The Legend of Zelda - Breath of the Wild"

F
 Fantasy Island: from the eponymous television series.
 Fearing Island: island site of rocket base in the Tom Swift, Jr. novels.
 Felimath: the second largest of the three Lone Islands in The Chronicles of Narnia seriesFernandos: the destination for matched couples on Take Me Out
 Finnigan Island: the island where John Patterson and one of his friends washed up on during a big storm in the 1999 cartoon of For Better or For Worse
 Flyspeck Island: from Curtis
 Isle of Fogg: the only one of the 23 (fictional) Outcropp Islands off the west coast of Scotland to be inhabited. It features in San Sombrèro: A Land of Carnivals, Cocktails and Coups.
 Forsaken Fortress: an island in the GameCube game, The Legend of Zelda: The Wind Waker.
 Fibber Island: a made-up island in a song by They Might Be Giants.
 Fraxos: a fictional island in The Magus, a novel written by John FowlesFur Step Island: a fictional island in the Nintendo Switch game, Super Mario 3D World + Bowser's Fury. 

G
 Gaea: an island off the coast of Portugal in the novel The Arm of the Starfish by Madeleine L'Engle, named for the Greek "Earth Mother" goddess Gaea
 Gaea's Navel: an island in the video game Chrono Cross
 Galaxy Island: from Our Man Flint
 Galuga Island: setting of the video games Contra, Contra: Shattered Soldier, and Contra 4
 Ganae: a Caribbean island in the novel No Other Life by Brian Moore
 Genosha: from Marvel Comics
 Gengoro Island: from Dr. Slump
 Gilligan's Island: from the eponymous TV series
 Goblin Island: island settled by the goblins from space lyrically conjured by Melodic Death Metal band Nekrogoblikon
 Gont: island in Ursula K. Le Guin's Earthsea books
 Goon Island : from Goonland, a Popeye the Sailor cartoon.  Popeye rescues his Pappy being held prisoner by the Goons on the island.
 Goose Island: island in Oregon in the film WarGames, home of Dr. Stephen Falken
 Grand Nixon Island: from Marvel Comics
 Gravett Island: the destination of escape pods from the USS Enterprise-E starship in the movie Star Trek: First Contact.
 Great Todday (Todaidh Mór): island in the Hebrides, companion of Little Todday in the novel Whisky Galore by Compton Mackenzie
 Greatfish Isle: an island in the GameCube game, The Legend of Zelda: The Wind Waker.Griffin Rock: the primary setting of the Transformers: Rescue Bots television series.
 Gristol: the setting for the video game Dishonored
 Guarma: the setting for the fifth chapter of Red Dead Redemption 2 game, an island set a bit east of Cuba.Gullah Gullah Island: in the TV series of the same name.

H
 Haleakaloha: island in French Polynesia in the movie Donovan's Reef
 Harper's Island: setting of the CBS horror/mystery series Harper's Island
 Haunted Isle: setting of the Scooby-Doo, Where Are You! episode "Hassle in the Castle"
 Havnor: island in Ursula K. Le Guin's Earthsea books
 Hedeby: island in The Girl with the Dragon Tattoo book by Stieg Larsson, where Harriet Vanger disappearedHenders Island: island in Fragment book by Warren Fahy.
 Hili-li Island: an inhabited island near the South Pole in the novel A Strange Discovery by Charles Romeyn Dake. It is south of Tsalal.
 Hi-yi-yi: where Rhinogrades once lived
 Hoenn: an archipelago from Pokémon Ruby and SapphireHollowrock Island: an island off the coast of Lockelle in the 2020 videogame Teardown
 Hope Island: Captain Planet and the Planeteers
 Horai Island: a Chinese-owned artificial island used to generate hydroelectric power in the anime series Code Geass: Lelouch of the Rebellion, which later becomes the home base of the Black Knights.
 Huella Islands: footprint-shaped islands off the coast of Cayenne, mentioned in the Hardy Boys books. They are ruled by a dictator, Juan Posada and their "spy chief" is named Bedoya. The adjective is Huellan.
 Hy Brazil: is a mythical island used as inspiration for Margaret Elphinstone's 2002 novel of that title
 Hydra Island: the second smaller Island off the coast of the main one in LOST

IIndian Island: from Agathe Christie's novel And Then There Were None
 Infant Island: the homeland of Mothra
 Island Closest to Heaven: from the Square Enix video game Final Fantasy VIII
 Island Closest to Hell: from the Square Enix video game Final Fantasy VIII
 The Island of Dr. Moreau: novel by H. G. Wells
 The Island of Time: from the video game Prince of Persia: Warrior Within
 Isla Cruces: the island where Davy Jones' heart was kept in Pirates of the Caribbean: Dead Man's Chest.
 Isla de Corales: an island resort in the Diary of a Wimpy Kid series.
 Isla de Muerta: the island where Captain Barbossa and his crew found the gold in Pirates of the Caribbean: The Curse of the Black Pearl, starring Johnny Depp
 Isla Los Organos: the location of the gene therapy clinic in Die Another Day, where Bond finds Zao.
 Island of Domination: Subject of a Judas Priest song from their album Sad Wings of Destiny.
 The Island: setting of the TV series Lost
 Island of Misfit Toys: from the 1964 stop-motion animated TV special "Rudolph the Rednosed Reindeer" 
 Isla Nublar: site of InGen's Jurassic ParkIsla Presidencial : an adult web animation from Venezuela.
 Isla Sorna: site of InGen's "Site B" (The Lost World and Jurassic Park III)
 Isle Delfino: setting of Super Mario Sunshine
 Isle de Gambino: an island town from the online community Gaia Online
 Isle Esme: a series of islands from Breaking Dawn by Stephenie Meyer.
 Isle o' Smiles: the seemingly paradisiac island from the video game Dragon Quest VI
 Isle of Armor: Pokémon Franchise
 Isle of the Damned: an island from the video game Chrono Cross
 Isle of the Storm: a small lake island in Fortnite: Battle Royale
 Isle of Perpetual Tickling: an island from the Veggietales episode Esther, the Girl Who Became Queen
 Itchy Island: from the American TV Cartoon Camp Lazlo
 Izayoi Island: from the Japanese anime TV series Stitch! based on the Disney animated film Lilo & Stitch
Isle of View Xanth novels by Piers Anthony
Isle of Illusion Xanth novels by Piers Anthony

J
 Jabberwock Island: a fictional island from the Danganronpa series
 Jambalaya Island: an ex-pirate island in the Caribbean, turned to a tourist attraction center, in the game Escape from Monkey Island
 Jarnesia Island: a fictional island from the French/Canadian animated television series Totally Spies!
 Javasu: an island in the Indian Ocean, the alleged country of "Princess Caraboo"
 Jean Bonney Island: in the Bay of Bengal, scene of Biggles and the Deep Blue Sea (1967)
 Jinsy: in the BBC TV series This is Jinsy

K
 Kaigoon; from Road to Singapore
 Kalokairi: from Mamma Mia!
 Kalimdor: from the video game World of Warcraft
 Kame House: from the anime Dragon Ball
 Karamja: from the world of Gielenor RuneScapeKatorga-12: island housing an abandoned ultra top-secret Soviet research facility off the Siberian coast from Singularity.
 Keelhaul Key: from the video game Paper Mario: The Thousand-Year Door
 Kilika: from Final Fantasy X and Final Fantasy X-2
 Kiloran: a Scottish island near Oban in the 1945 movie I Know Where I'm Going! based on the island of Colonsay.
 Kinakuta: island state in Southeast Asia of Neal Stephenson's novel Cryptonomicon. Compare Queena-Kootah in Neal Stephenson's novel The Confusion
 King's Head Island: an island in the television series Bob's Burgers
 Kinkow: a supernatural island in the television series Pair of Kings on Disney XD
 Kirrin Island: in the Famous Five children's books by Enid Blyton
 Kitchen Island: from the Wario Land series
 Koholint Island: from the video game The Legend of Zelda: Link's Awakening
 Kokovoko: from the Herman Melville novel Moby-Dick (Queequeq is from Kokovoko)
 Koo Koo Island: an island in the West Indies briefly mentioned in Carry On at Your Convenience
 Krakoa: a sentient island from Marvel Comics
 Krawk Island: an island in Neopia
 Kuaki: a southern Pacific island from McHale's Navy where Lieutenant Gloria Winters and Quartermaster George 'Christy' Christopher get married
 Kyoshi Island: from Avatar: The Last Airbender

L
 Lapak: from the novel Alaska by James A. Michener
 Laputa: flying island from Gulliver's Travels by Jonathan Swift
 Lavalava Island: from the video game Paper Mario
 Lea Monde: from the video game Vagrant Story
 Leap Islands: from The Monikins by James Fenimore Cooper
 LEGO Island: from the video games LEGO Island, LEGO Island 2: The Brickster's Revenge and Island Xtreme Stunts.
 Leshp: from Discworld series by Terry Pratchett
 Lian Yu: an island in the TV series Arrow
 L'île aux Enfants: from the French TV show L'île aux Enfants
 Lilliput: from the novel Gulliver's Travels by Jonathan Swift
 Lincoln Island: from Jules Verne's novel The Mysterious Island 
 Lingshe Island: in the novel The Heavenly Sword and the Dragon Saber by Jinyong
 Little Todday (Todaidh Beag): an island in the Hebrides, companion of Great Todday in the novel Whisky Galore by Compton Mackenzie
 Living Island: main setting of H.R. Pufnstuf
 Lucre Island: a pirate island in the game Escape from Monkey Island
 Lutari Island: an island in Neopia

MMacross Island : a south Pacific island from the anime series The Super Dimension Fortress Macross or the American version Robotech.
 Mako Island : a Pacific island off Australia from the television series H2O: Just Add Water
 Mallet Island: from the video game Devil May Cry
 Maple Island: is an island from the video game MapleStory where beginners start and train before leaving to Victoria Island.
 Mardi archipelago: from Herman Melville's Mardi and a Voyage Thither
 Mata Nui: from Bionicle
 Matool: from the film Zombi 2
 McHale Island: an island appropriated for the use of the crew of PT-73 in the 1960s sitcom McHale's Navy, named after the PT boat's skipper, LtCmdr. Quinton McHale.Medici: setting of the video game Just Cause 3
 Melaswen: an island from Days of Our Lives
 Mêlée Island: a pirate island in the Caribbean the Monkey Island games, part of the Tri-Island area (governed by Elaine Marley)
 Membata: The Island on Lost that the Oceanic 6 claim to have crashed on.
 Milf Island: the location of a fictional reality show in which a lone pubescent boy lives on an island with many amorous mature women.
 Misty Isles: Home of Princess (later Queen) Aleta in Prince Valiant comics.
 Moahu: island in the Pacific encountered in Patrick O'Brian's novels, The Wine-Dark Sea and The Truelove
 Moesko Island: island from The Ring by Gore Verbinski
 Monsterland / Monster Island: from the Godzilla series
 Monster Isle: from the 2016 reboot of The Powerpuff Girls
 Morabunda: uncharted Pacific island from McHale's Navy.
 Muir Island: from Marvel Comics
 Mypos: Greek island homeland of Balki Bartokomous in Perfect Strangers
 Myst: from the adventure computer game Myst
 The Mysterious Island of Mystery: from the video game Kingdom of Loathing
 Mystery Island: an island in the video game Neopets

N
  Navarone: fictional Greek island housing a German heavy gun battery in "The Guns of Navarone (novel)" and the film based on it
 Nepenthe: in the 1917 novel South Wind, located off the coast of Italy in the Tyrrhenian Sea; a thinly fictionalized Capri
 Neri's Island: Neri's home in Ocean Girl
 Neverland: an island that apparently exists outside of time, as its inhabitants never age or die, from the Peter Pan books and movies
 New America: an island northwest of Greenland in The Adventures of Captain Hatteras by Jules Verne
 New Island: an unfinished country from the 2009 video game Little King's Story
 Nibelia: a Mediterranean-based island nation in Seek and Destroy (2002 video game)
 N. Sanity Island: the home of Crash Bandicoot in the video game of the same title
 Isle of Naboombu: kingdom of anthropomorphic animals in the Disney film Bedknobs and Broomsticks
 Nowhere Island: in Ten Little Children  by Agatha Christie (in later editions the name was changed to "Indian Island" or "Soldier Island")
 Nim's Island: an island from the movie of the same name
 Nollop: in Ella Minnow Pea (2001) by Mark Dunn is an island off the coast of the U.S. state of South Carolina
 North Pole: is an Island Nation in the Arctic Ocean at 180°N NaN°E/W is a part of The United Nations governed by Santa Claus
 Nomanisan Island: widely accepted term for the island in The Incredibles
 Nontoonyt Island: from the adventure computer game Leisure Suit Larry Goes Looking for Love (in Several Wrong Places)
 Nowhere Islands: setting of Mother 3
 Null Island: located in the Gulf of Guinea at 0°N 0°E
 Númenor: home of the Dúnedain before their downfall in J. R. R. Tolkien's Legendarium

O
 Odo Island: from the original Godzilla
 Okishima Island: from the novel Battle Royale by Koushun Takami and the film Battle Royale by Kinji Fukasaku
 Olympus: an artificial island nation, run by genetic modified humans and advanced technology, Appleseed manga
 Oni Island: a moving demonic island in Ōkami
 Ooo: the main island of the television series Adventure Time
 Orange Islands: an extensive island chain consisting of various active islands, Pokémon anime
 Outset Island:, the home of Link in the GameCube Game The Legend of Zelda: The Wind Waker
 Oxbay: a small colony island in Pirates of the Caribbean video game
 Outcast Island: in Dragon Riders of Berk

P
 Pahkitew Island: from the animated TV series Total Drama
 Pala: island utopia in Aldous Huxley's Island
 Palanai, an island neighboring Banoi, which is near Papua New Guinea, and the setting for Dead Island: Riptide.
 Panau: from Just Cause 2
 Pangabula Island: an island in the children's television story show Jay Jay the Jet Plane
 Pantala: a continent in the book series Wings of Fire by Tui T. Sutherland
 Papuwa Island: From Papuwa
 Paradis: an island from Attack on Titan manga and anime series, where most of the story takes place. The island is modeled after Madagascar.
 Paradise Island (later known as Themyscira): in the Wonder Woman comics.
 Parrot Island: The Suite Life on Deck
 Pescespada Island: from the movie The Life Aquatic with Steve Zissou
 Phatt Island: an island in the Caribbean in the game Monkey Island 2: LeChuck's Revenge
 Pharmaul: a large island five hundred miles off the south west coast of Africa in "The Tribe That Lost Its Head" and "Richer Than All His Tribe" by Nicholas Monsarrat.
 Phraxos: a Greek island that is the setting for much of John Fowles' postmodern novel, The Magus. It is based on the real Greek island of Spetses
 Piggy Island: is an island where the characters from the Angry Birds franchise reside.
 Ping Islands: from the movie The Life Aquatic with Steve Zissou
 Pi'illo Island: from the fourth installment of the Mario and Luigi RPG series, Mario and Luigi Dream Team
 Plunder Island: a pirate island in the Caribbean in the game The Curse of Monkey Island, part of the Tri-Island area (governed by Elaine Marley)
 Pokoponesia: island nation from the animated version of The Tick
 Pom Pom Galli: an uninhabited island or atoll from the movie The Sea Chase, starring John Wayne and Lana Turner.
 Pondelayo: island featured in Joan Lindsay's Through Darkest Pondelayo, a novel she wrote under the pseudonym Serena Livingstone-Stanley.
 Poodle Island: island prison from FETCH! with Ruff Ruffman
 Prawn Island: from Grand Theft Auto: Vice City and Grand Theft Auto: Vice City Stories
 Proasis Island: a fictional island from the French/Canadian animated television series Totally Spies!
 Punk Hazard: an island in the New World in the One Piece series.
 Pyrrhia: a continent in the book series Wings of Fire by Tui T. Sutherland

Q
 Qwghlm: a pair of British islands in the novels of Neal Stephenson

R
 Ramita de la Baya: "Twig in the Bay" a small island dividing the United States and Mexico in Red Dead Redemption
 Rastepappe: Pacific island inhabited by koalas and badgers in the children's book and TV series Archibald the Koala
 Riten Kyo: from the video game Samurai Shodown Warrior's Rage 2
 Riven: from the adventure computer game Riven
 R'lyeh: home of Cthulhu in H. P. Lovecraft's fiction
 Rockfort Island: from the video game Resident Evil – Code: Veronica
 Roke Island: the island where the wizard school in the Earthsea trilogy, by Ursula K. Le Guin, is based
 Rokkenjima: from the visual novel Umineko no Naku Koro Ni
 Roo Island: an island in Neopia
 Rook Islands, the setting of the video game  Far Cry 3; a small island cluster somewhere between Thailand and New Guinea
 Round Island: from the video game Final Fantasy VII
 Rugged Island: from the sitcom Father Ted, next door to Craggy Island

S
 The Sabaody Archipelago: from the One Piece manga series.
 Sahrani: a fictional island in the 2006 video game, ArmA: Armed Assault
 Saint Caro: the fictional Caribbean island setting featured in Albert H. Z. Carr's novel Finding Maubee
 Saint Eustace Island:A fictional island off the coast of Collinsport, Maine in the television series Dark Shadows. 
 Saint George's Island: a fictional island in Yes Prime Minister
 Saint Honoré: a fictional Caribbean island featured in Agatha Christie's novel A Caribbean Mystery
 Saint Marie: a fictional Caribbean island featured in Death in Paradise. It is implied that the island is either a British protectorate or a Crown Colony
 San Esperito: an island nation from Just Cause
 San Lorenzo: the setting for much of Kurt Vonnegut's novel Cat's Cradle
 San Monique: the setting of the James Bond film Live and Let Die
 San Piedro Island: Washington: from the novel Snow Falling on Cedars by David Guterson
 San Serriffe: April Fools' Day joke, The Guardian
 Sand Island: from the video game Ace Combat 5: The Unsung War
 Sandy Island Sannikov Land: a real world phantom island in the Arctic from Vladimir Obruchev's novel Sannikov Land (1926) and its Soviet film adaptation Sannikov Land (1973)
 Sans Souci (island of no worries): small private island featured in novel Deirdre, the Wanderer, by Jonnie Comet
 Santa Marta: a fictional Caribbean island in the novel and film Island in the Sun
 Scabb Island: an anarchic pirate island in the Caribbean in the game Monkey Island 2: LeChuck's Revenge
 Scheria: island in Homer's Odyssey, where Odysseus meets Nausicca and Alcinous.
 Seal Island: The Suite Life on Deck
 Seaheaven Island: an artificial island from The Truman ShowSeven Bay Island: an island off the coast of the Northeastern United States, in the Austin family series of books by Madeleine L'Engle. Setting of the novel A Ring of Endless Light
 Sevii Islands: a region in the fictional Pokémon universe, introduced in the Pokémon FireRed and LeafGreen video games
 Shadow Moses Island: from Metal Gear Solid video game
 Sheena Island: from the game Resident Evil Survivor
 Ship-Trap Island: the setting of Richard Connell's story The Most Dangerous Game
 Shipwreck Island: the meeting place of the Brethren Court in Pirates of the Caribbean: At World's End
 Shutter Island: the setting of the movie, directed by Martin Scorsese, titled Shutter Island
 Sicmon Islands: a chain of six islands in the South Pacific (Arbah, Katie, Katin, Ta Fin, Quepol and Typ), figuring in Nick Bantock's novels of The Griffin and Sabine Trilogy
 Sinnoh: location in the Pokémon universe
 Skeleton Key: an island just off of Cuba, known in Spanish as 'Cayo Esqueleto', in the novel of the same name from the Alex Rider series by Anthony Horowitz.
 Skira: an island near China and Russia that is occupied by the People's Liberation Army in the game Operation Flashpoint: Dragon Rising
 Skull Island: the island King Kong is from, also a duck-shaped island in the computergame The Curse of Monkey Island
 Sky Island: a flying island, setting for Sky Island by L. Frank Baum
 Skypiea: an island in the sky, from the One Piece manga series.
 Island of Sodor: between England and the Isle of Man, the setting for the Reverend Awdry's Thomas the Tank Engine railway network managed by "The Fat Controller"
 Soleanna: an island kingdom from the 2006 video game Sonic the Hedgehog, inspired by Venice, Italy
 Solgell Island: from the 1967 Japanese movie Son of Godzilla
 Solís: an island nation from Just Cause 4
 Southern Island in Hetalia: Axis Powers, a Japanese animation
 Southern Isles: the homeland of Hans from Disney's Frozen, inspired by Denmark
 Southern Mauristemo Islands: an internet hoax
 Spidermonkey Island: a floating island in Hugh Lofting's The Voyages of Doctor Dolittle
 Spoon Island: home of Wyndemere Castle, across the harbor of Port Charles, New York (fictional city), fictional island on the soap opera General Hospital.
 Starfish Island: from Grand Theft Auto: Vice City and Grand Theft Auto: Vice City Stories
 Sula: a Scottish island featuring in an eponymous series of children's books by Lavinia Derwent
 Sunda: a former Dutch colony, neighbouring Indonesia but not part of it, in Eric Ambler's "State of Siege" (the name "Sunda" has many real-life connotations, but is not in reality the name of one specific island)
 Spider-Skull Island: from The Venture Bros.
 Spindrift Island: off the coast of New Jersey, in the Rick Brant novels by John Blaine
 Summerisle: a fictional Hebridean island and the setting of Robin Hardy's 1973 movie The Wicker Man
 Summerset Isle: the homeland of the High Elves from Bethesda's Softworks' The Elder Scrolls
 Summer Camp Island: an island where most monsters live and where most magic exists in the TV series Summer Camp Island
 St Gregory: a Channel Island in the TV series Island at War
 Struay: a Hebridean island, the setting of the Katie Morag series of picturebooks by Mairi Hedderwick
 Swallow, Flint, Mango & Mastodon Islands: in the children's novel Secret Water by Arthur Ransome
 Syberia:  an island in the Arctic from the game by the same name and its sequels by Benoît Sokal

T
 Tabor Island: from Jules Verne's novel In Search of the Castaways
 Tanakuatua: Pacific island in John Wyndham's novel Web
 Tanetane Island: an island in the video game Mother 3
 Taratupa: an island in the Pacific Ocean housing a US Navy PT boat base and one of two primary settings in the 1960s sitcom McHale's Navy.
 Tatsumi Port Island: from the video game Persona 3
 Tatsumiya Island: from Fafner of the Azure
 Tenrou Island: an island in Fairy Tail where the "S-Class Mage Promotion Trial" takes place.
 The Island: the island that the survivors of Oceanic Flight 815 crash on in LOST
  The Isles of Syren: the islands on which Septimus, Jenna, and Beetle are trapped on when Spit Fyre breaks his tail in Septimus Heap book five: Syren
 Tinda Lau: an island in the South Pacific, northeast of Australia, featured in the daytime soap opera Days of Our Lives
 Tingle Island: home of Tingle in the GameCube Game The Legend of Zelda: The Wind Waker
 Themyscira: in the Wonder Woman comics.
 Todday Island: a Hebridean island featured in the 1949 film Whisky Galore!.  It combined the two islands, Great Todday and Little Todday, from the original novel by Compton Mackenzie.
 Tolaria, an island on the plane of Dominaria in the lore for Magic: the Gathering.
 Tol Eressëa: "The Lonely Island" near Valinor inhabited by the Teleri Elves, in J.R.R. Tolkien's The Silmarillion
 Tom Sawyer's Island: the island in the Mississippi River on which Tom Sawyer and Huck Finn live for a few days in The Adventures of Tom Sawyer
 Tracy Island: an island in the TV series Thunderbirds
 Treasure Island: the island from the novel by Robert Louis Stevenson. The map of the island in the book is probably based on Unst in Shetland, which Stevenson visited.
 Tsalal: an island in the novel The Narrative of Arthur Gordon Pym by Edgar Allan Poe and its sequel An Antarctic Mystery by Jules Verne
 Tuvalagi: one of many Pacific islands in McHale's Navy, home to a Japanese artillery company.

U
 Uffa: mentioned in Sir Arthur Conan Doyle's story "The Five Orange Pips"
 Unova: Pokémon Black and White
 Utopia: from Sir Thomas More's book of the same name
 Uncharted Island: an uncharted island from Uncharted: Drake's Fortune
 Useless Island: an island on the plane of Ixalan, named by the planeswalker Jace Beleren, in Magic: the Gathering lore.
 Uzo Island: an island in Phantasy Star II where the Maruera tree is said to be found.

V
 Vanutu: from the novel State of Fear by Michael Crichton
 Villings: from The Invention of Morel by Adolfo Bioy Casares
 Volcano Island: from the animated series The Replacements
 Voya Nui: another fictional Bionicle island
 Vvardenfell: the setting for the computer game The Elder Scrolls III: Morrowind

W
 W Island: from the novel W, or the Memory of Childhood by Georges Perec
 Waponi Wu: from the movie Joe Versus the Volcano
 Water Seven: from One Piece.
 Wayo Wayo: from the novel The Man with the Compound Eyes by Wu Ming-Yi
 Wedge Island: a golf island from Wii Sports Resort and other Wii games
 Wild Island: from the stories of My Father's Dragon by Ruth Stiles Gannett
 Wild Cat Island: in the children's novel Swallows and Amazons by Arthur Ransome
 Windfall Island: from the GameCube Game The Legend of Zelda: The Wind Waker
 Wuhu Island: an archipelago/beach resort from Wii Sports Resort
 Warbler: from the novel Island of Silence in The Unwanteds series by Lisa McMann

Y
 Yara: setting of Far Cry 6; a Caribbean island ruled as a dictatorship, evocative of Cuba (which exists in the game's world as well and is implied to be in close proximity to Yara)Yew: setting for The Enchanted Island of Yew by L. Frank Baum
 Yoshi's IslandZ
 Zandia: home of Brother Blood and "safe harbor" for supervillains in Teen Titans and other DC Comics titles
 Zendia: setting of the Zendian problem
 Zolon: in the Novarian series, an island thalassocracy ruled by a High Admiral.
 Zou: island from One Piece Manga series
 Zoombini Isle': the origin of the Zoombinis, featured in the Logical Journey PC puzzle game

Unnamed
 The island in Brave New World by Aldous Huxley
 The island in Robinson Crusoe by Daniel Defoe
 The island in Lord of the Flies by William Golding
 The Outer Hebrides island in the children's novel Great Northern? by Arthur Ransome
 The island in the Windows and Game Boy Advance video game Backyard Football 2006 The island in the 1980 film The Blue Lagoon and its 1991 sequel Return to the Blue Lagoon (called "Palm Tree Island" in the novel)
 The island in Theodor Herzl's Altneuland (unnamed, but specified as being part of the Cook Islands, near Raratonga)
The island, which was the location of the Fountain of Youth, in the 2011 film Pirates of the Caribbean: On Stranger Tides''
 The unnamed Pacific island where Megatron makes his base in Transformers (2003 video game).

See also
 Phantom island
 List of fictional countries

References

External links

Islands, List of fictional
 
Fictional